"Can't Be Really Gone" is a song written by Gary Burr, and recorded by American country music artist Tim McGraw.  It was released in October 1995 as the second single from his album All I Want.  It peaked at number two on the United States Billboard country chart, and number four on the Canadian RPM country chart.

Track listing
Single
 Can't Be Really Gone 	3:20 	
 That's Just Me 	3:13

Content
The song is a ballad where the narrator observes the various items that his lover has left behind. He tells himself that she "can't be really gone" if she has left behind an unfinished book and her favorite shoes.

Music video
The music video premiered on CMT on October 28, 1995, when CMT named it a "Hot Shot", and was directed and produced by Sherman Halsey. It features McGraw performing the song in a room, with an orchestra behind him, and showing people in their everyday lives. At the end of the video, there was a hotline number for the Minnie Pearl Cancer Foundation.

Critical reception
Stephen Thomas Erlewine and Thom Jurek, in their review of the album, said that McGraw delivered the song with sincerity, and that it and other similar songs showed his artistic growth over Not a Moment Too Soon, his last album.

Chart positions
"Can't Be Really Gone" re-entered the U.S. Billboard Hot Country Singles & Tracks as an official single at number 67 for the week of October 21, 1995.

Year-end charts

References

1995 singles
1995 songs
Tim McGraw songs
Songs written by Gary Burr
Song recordings produced by Byron Gallimore
Song recordings produced by James Stroud
Music videos directed by Sherman Halsey
Curb Records singles
Country ballads